Michel Erhart ( 1440 to 1445 – after 1522, Ulm) was a German late Gothic sculptor who lived and worked in Ulm.

Life 

Erhart spent his journeyman years in various regions including Konstanz and the Netherlands before finally settling in Ulm around 1469, where works by him are extant from around 1469–1522. He worked in the workshop of Jörg Syrlin the Elder, as did his sons Gregor Erhart and Bernhard Erhart. After 1474 he apparently had his own workshop with numerous apprentices.

Erhart's style was apparently influenced by Nikolaus Gerhaert.

Further reading 
 Barbara Maier-Lörcher: Meisterwerke Ulmer Kunst. Thorbecke-Verlag, Ostfildern 2004, .
 Brigitte Reinhardt (ed.): Michel Erhart & Jörg Syrlin d. Ä. Spätgotik in Ulm. Konrad Theiss Verlag, Stuttgart 2002, .
 Barbara Schäuffelen, Joachim Feist: Ulm – Porträt einer Stadtlandschaft, Konrad Theiss Verlag, Stuttgart 1987, p. 171.
 Anja Schneckenburger-Broschek. "Erhart." In Grove Art Online. Oxford Art Online, (accessed December 31, 2011; subscription required).

External links 
 
 
 Entry for Michel Erhart on the Union List of Artist Names
 Frank Kressing: Konzept einer Stadtführung für die ehemalige freie Reichsstadt Ulm, Universität Augsburg, 2006

People from Ulm
1440s births
16th-century deaths
Gothic sculptors
15th-century German sculptors
German male sculptors
16th-century German sculptors